The Sidna 'Ali Mosque (Masjid Sidna 'Ali; , Misgad Sidna Ali) is a mosque located in the depopulated village of Al-Haram on the beach in the northern part of Herzliya in Israel. It served, as of 1998, as both a mosque and a religious school.

The mosque is situated around a tomb reputed to be that of a local saint, Ali b. Alim who died in 1081. Ali was described as great scholar and miracle worker by Sultan Baybars' biographer, Muhyi al-Din (died 1292). According to Mujir al-Din (writing c. 1496), the tomb was visited by Baybars in 1265. Baybars prayed for victory before retaking Arsuf from the crusaders. An annual festival that was attested here in the 15th century continued up to the 1940s.

The existing building contains parts of different ages of construction and repair, however Petersen claims that none from before the 15th century, while Taragan identifies elements, specifically the entrance door to the minaret, which fit the style of other early Mamluk religious buildings from the 1270s-90s, noting though that no written documents remain to support such an early date for the mosque. The part of the building described as the oldest in 1950 has since disappeared. Taragan places the construction of the vaulted arcades to sometime between the thirteenth and fifteenth centuries, with important additions made in the late 15th century, including the well, a marble monument on the tomb and an unidentified tower. The rooms on the second floor and the inscription now placed opposite the mihrab were added. The minaret was destroyed by naval bombardment in World War I and since rebuilt. Major repair work was done in 1926, the 1950s and 1991–1992.

Since 1990, not least due to its central location in Israel, the shrine is again a popular target for pilgrimage for Israeli Arabs from the villages of the Galilee and townspeople from places like Jaffa and Ramla, coming on Fridays to pray at the tomb and participate in different ceremonies.

See also
Maqam (shrine), a type of Muslim shrine widely known in the Levant

References

Bibliography

Ephrat, Daphna (2009): The Shaykh, the Physical Setting and the Holy Site: the diffusion of the Qadiri path in late medieval Palestine. In JRAS (Journal of the Royal Asiatic Society), Series 3, 19, 1 (2009), pp. 1–20.

External links

Survey of Western Palestine, Map 10: IAA, Wikimedia commons

Mamluk architecture in Israel
Mosques in Israel
Land of Israel
National parks of Israel
Islamic holy places
Caravanserais in Israel
Buildings and structures in Tel Aviv District